Sergio Espinoza (25 December 1928 – 10 August 2015) was a Chilean footballer. He played in seven matches for the Chile national football team from 1953 to 1957. He was also part of Chile's squad for the 1953 South American Championship.

References

External links
 

1928 births
2015 deaths
Chilean footballers
Chile international footballers
Place of birth missing
Association football forwards
Audax Italiano footballers